Petr Cibulka (born 27 October 1950) is a Czech politician and dissident. He is the founder and leader of the minor Right Bloc political party.

Communist era
Cibulka was born in Brno, Czechoslovakia. As a former member of Charter 77, Cibulka was imprisoned multiple times during Communist rule in Czechoslovakia. Prior to the Velvet Revolution in 1989, Cibulka had been arrested three times, and spent a total of four years in prison for distributing non-official cultural and musical material. During the Velvet Revolution, he was again arrested and imprisoned, but was released as crowds gathered in front of the prison in which he was held and demanded his release.

StB archives disclosure    
In the early 1990s, Cibulka published material from still-classified StB archives, containing lists of tens of thousands names of people with connections to the secret services. In 1999, he published a second edition of the list in book form. The book sold five times as many copies as the average work of fiction. A searchable electronic version was added later.

In 2003, the Czech government published similar, but much shorter lists, along with the very few personal files kept by the StB.

Other activities
Cibulka published an online political journal entitled "Uncensored News".

He is also the founder and leader of a tiny political party, the Right Bloc. He was nominated by the party as its candidate in the 2013 presidential election, but he was able to collect only 300 signatures of the required 50,000, and did not qualify as a candidate.

References

External links 
 Party website

1950 births
Living people
Czech politicians
Charter 77 signatories
Czechoslovak prisoners and detainees
Prisoners and detainees of Czechoslovakia
People of the Velvet Revolution
Candidates in the 2013 Czech presidential election